North Caspian Operating Company (NCOC) is an operating company for the North Caspian Sea Production Sharing Agreement (NCSPSA).  NCOC is  based in Atyrau, Kazakhstan.  The agreement includes seven companies consisting of KazMunayGas, Eni, ExxonMobil, Royal Dutch Shell, Total S.A. (16.81% each ), China National Petroleum Corporation (8.4%) and Inpex, (7.56%).

Company 
NCOC was created in 2009 taking responsibilities from Agip KCO. The offices of NCOC are in Atyrau, Kazakhstan. As of July 2015, the company employed 2584 personnel.

Production 

Production began on 11 September 2013 and was halted on 24 September 2013 after experiencing pipe failures. The project went through a complete pipe replacement. Production from the kashagan field is expected to start 23 October 2016 with an initial production of 75,000 barrels per day.

See also 

 Kashagan Field

References

External links
 

Non-renewable resource companies established in 2009
Oil and gas companies of Kazakhstan
2009 establishments in Kazakhstan